Cyril "Skhokho" Nzama (born 26 June 1974 in Soweto, Gauteng) is a retired South African football (soccer) defender who last played for Batau FC.

Nzama made 44 appearances for the South African national football team from 2000 to 2007. He was also a participant at the 2002 FIFA World Cup.

References

External links

1974 births
Living people
South African soccer players
South Africa international soccer players
2002 FIFA World Cup players
Kaizer Chiefs F.C. players
Bush Bucks F.C. players
Association football defenders
Sportspeople from Soweto
Bay United F.C. players
Batau F.C. players